A maximal unique match or MUM, for short, is part of a key step
 in the multiple sequence alignment of genomes in computational biology.  Identification of MUMs and other potential anchors, is the first step in larger alignment systems such as MUMmer. Anchors are the areas between two genomes where they are highly similar.  To understand what a MUM is we each word in the acronym can be broken down individually.  Match implies that the substring occurs in both sequences to be aligned.  Unique means that the substring occurs only once in each sequence.  Finally, maximal states that the substring is not part of another larger string that fulfills both prior requirements.  The idea behind this, is that long sequences that match exactly and occur only once in each genome are almost certainly part of the global alignment.

Formal Definition 

"Given two genomes A and B, Maximal Unique Match (MUM) substring is a common substring of A and B of length longer than a specified minimum length d (by default d = 20) such that
 it is maximal, that is, it cannot be extended on either end without incurring a mismatch; and
 it is unique in both sequences"

Algorithm 
Identifying the set of MUMs in two very long genome sequences is not computationally trivial. There are several algorithmic ways to approach identifying MUMs in multiple sequence alignment. Finally you must ensure that   is unique in both genomes. The complexity of the brute force method is thus .

A list is then created for all internal nodes with exactly one child from each genome sequence.

A red leaf denotes that the leaf came from string S and a blue leaf denotes string . The internal node at A was discarded because  meaning the character that comes before both A's is identical (T), this is condition where the sequences belongs to a larger unique sequence. The internal node at C is discarded because it has two children from S.  This leaves us with the MUMs of G and TA.

Example 
To illustrate MUMs further, we take the following example.  Let's say that d=3 and our two genomes are as follows:

S = CTACTGTCATGCTGAAGTCATGCGGCTGGCTTAT# 
T = CTGGTGTGATGCTAAGTCATGCGGTCTGGCTTAT$

Working through the sequence our first MUM that satisfies the conditions occurs here:

S = CTACCATGCTGAAGTCATGCGGCTGGCTTAT# 
T = CTGGGATGCTAAGTCATGCGGTCTGGCTTAT$

TGT is at least d in length, occurs only once in both sequences, and the characters to the left and right  differ between genomes.  To illustrate an example where expansion is needed to ensure that our MUM is not part of a larger sequence and unique, take the following:

S = CTACCCTGAAGTCATGCGGCTGGCTTAT# 
T = CTGGGCTAAGTCATGCGGTCTGGCTTAT$

There are two problems in the case of testing ATG as a MUM because ATG is not unique and it is also part of a larger subsequence as illustrated here:

S = CTACCCTGAAGTCATGCGGCTGGCTTAT#
T = CTGGGCTAAGTCATGCGGTCTGGCTTAT$

Therefore expansion of this sequence is required in an attempt to satisfy the conditions for being a MUM as shown here.

S = CTACCGAAGTCATGCGGCTGGCTTAT#
T = CTGGGAAGTCATGCGGTCTGGCTTAT$

Using this method iteratively produces a final product where each MUM is identified for clarity each MUM is colored-coded:

S = CTACCG#
T = ACTTGT$

Maximal Exact Match (MEM)  
MUMs are a subset of a larger set referred to as Maximal Exact Matches or MEMS.  In a MEM the unique condition of MUMs is relaxed.  MEMs are like local alignment but in this case only identify sequences where there are no gaps.

Related Topics 
MUMmer
Sequence alignment
Multiple sequence alignment

References

Sequence alignment algorithms